Rhumb may refer to:
 Rhumb line, a navigational path with a constant bearing
 one of the 16 or 32 points of the compass (now rare)

See also 
 RumB, an enzyme
 Rhum (disambiguation)
 Rhombus (disambiguation)